Highland Community College may refer to:
Highland Community College (Illinois), Freeport, Illinois, U.S.
Highland Community College (Kansas), Highland, Kansas, U.S.